The 5th Mississippi Infantry Regiment was a regiment of infantry in the Confederate States Army during the American Civil War. It fought in many battles and campaigns in the American Civil War.

The 5th Mississippi was organized in the fall of 1861 by Albert E. Fant.

Companies

Company A -- Red Rovers (raised in Monroe County, MS)
Company B -- Bogue Chitto Rangers (raised in Neshoba County, MS)
Company C -- Lauderdale Springs Greys (raised in Lauderdale County, MS)
Company D -- New Prospect Greys (raised in Winston County, MS)
Company E -- Pettus Rebels (raised in Winston County, MS)
Company F -- Winston Rifles (raised in Winston County, MS)
Company G -- Barry Guards (raised in Chickasaw & Choctaw Counties, MS)
Company H -- Noxubee Blues (raised in Noxubee County, MS)
Company I -- Kemper Rebels, aka Kemper Guards (raised in Kemper County, MS)
Company K -- Scotland Guards (raised in Neshoba County, MS)

Battles and campaigns

The 5th Mississippi was organized in the spring of 1861. The first battle that the 5th fought was at the Battle of Pensacola. The army was surrendered April 26, 1865, and paroled at Greensboro, North Carolina.

See also
List of Mississippi Civil War Confederate units

Notes

References
Military Annals of Mississippi: Military Organizations which Entered the Service of the Confederate States of America from the State of Mississippi, by John C. Rietti, Spartanburg, South Carolina: Reprint Company Publishers, 1976

Encyclopedia of Mississippi History, by Dunbar Rowland: Selwyn A. Brant, Publisher, 1907

Military units and formations disestablished in 1865
Military units and formations established in 1861
Units and formations of the Confederate States Army from Mississippi
1861 establishments in Mississippi